Frances Augusta Conant (Hemingway; December 23, 1842 - April 28, 1903) was an American journalist, editor, and businesswoman. She was the founder and principal promoter of the Illinois Woman's Press Association (IWPA). Conant died in 1903.

Early life and education
Frances Augusta Hemingway was born in West Burlington, New York, December 23, 1842. Her parents were Curtis and Martha R. Hemingway. She was educated in the western part of the State and in Brooklyn. In early girlhood, she became a contributor to New York publications.

Career
In 1864, in Brooklyn, she married Claudius W. Conant, of New York. After 1892, Conant became a resident of Chicago, Illinois. She usually passed the winters in traveling through the South. She was for several years a special correspondent of the Living Church and a contributor to the Advance and other religious publications of Chicago, as well as to some journals, and, occasionally, short stories of hers appeared in leading New York City and Philadelphia publications. During the World Cotton Centennial of 1884–85, she was the only special woman correspondent in New Orleans for a mechanical and scientific journal, ably representing the "Industrial World," of Chicago.

She often wrote as a collaborator with her husband, who was connected with the American Field, and they frequently did editorial work interchangeably. Conant is an earnest advocate of the cause of industrial education, and she was editor and business manager of the "Journal of Industrial Education" in the early days of its publication. Her reputation as a writer of short sketches of travel lead to an engagement as editor of the American Traveler and Tourist, published in Chicago, which position she held for two years, until she became interested in a commercial enterprise. Though rarely working in any associations, she developed ability as a promoter and organizer.

Following up on an idea of Marion A. McBride of The Boston Post during the World Cotton Centennial, Conant and Dr. Julia Holmes Smith helped found the IWPA, and Conant was the principal promoter of the IWPA, the first independent State organization for the purpose of affording practical assistance to women in literary pursuits. She was secretary of that association for the first two years, and received an honorary life membership in recognition of her services.

Conant was noted for being generous in giving time and thought to all appeals for help. Like many women in public work, she became the constant recipient of touching appeals from other women, usually those without technical training, for assistance to occupations by which they could earn a living. She became oppressed by the problem: "What shall we do with this unskilled army?" When a plan for employing large numbers of these untrained applicants was presented to Conant she withdrew from editorial work, in 1891, to engage in the promotion and organization of a corporation projected to give, eventually, remunerative employment to thousands of women in all parts of the country. She was secretary of the company during its first year and took an active part in the business management, then she resigned her trust to others, having made a record of phenomenal success. The year closed with the company well established.

Death
She died April 28, 1903 in Cook County, Illinois.

References

Bibliography

External links
 

1842 births
1903 deaths
19th-century American women writers
19th-century American journalists
People from Burlington, New York
American women journalists
Journalists from Illinois
American magazine editors
Women magazine editors
Wikipedia articles incorporating text from A Woman of the Century